Joseph Brian Doyle (15 July 1930 – 22 December 1992) was a footballer who played in the Football League for Bristol Rovers, Exeter City and Stoke City. After finishing his playing career Doyle went into coaching and became manager at Stockport County and Workington.

Career
Doyle was born in Salford and played for amateur side Lostock Green before joining Manchester City in 1949 but he left for Stoke City without playing a match. He broke into the first team at the Victoria Ground in 1952–53 and played 19 times but injury kept him out of the following season and once he recovered manager Frank Taylor deemed him surplus to requirements and he left for Exeter City. He enjoyed a good three-year spell at St James Park under the management of Norman Dodgin and made just over 100 appearances. He then had a less successful three year seasons at Bristol Rovers making 44 appearances but he did scored his only career goal for the club. Doyle then went into coaching and later became manager of Workington (1968–1971) and Stockport County (1972–1974).

Career statistics
Source:

References

English footballers
Manchester City F.C. players
Stoke City F.C. players
Exeter City F.C. players
Bristol Rovers F.C. players
English Football League players
Stockport County F.C. managers
Workington A.F.C. managers
1930 births
1992 deaths
Association football defenders
English football managers